Anthonomus signatus, the strawberry bud weevil, is a weevil that is a significant pest of strawberries in North America. It is also thought to be a major pest to raspberries. It is native to North America.

Life history 
The adult weevil is about 1/8 of an inch with copper back and white stripes. They are generalists and eat the pollen of their host plants. Female A. signatus lay their eggs on flower buds and then sever the bud from the plant. This habit has given rise to another common name for the species, 'Clipper'.  Each female can lay up to 75 eggs per season.

See also 
 Anthonomus rubi (strawberry blossom weevil)

References 

Curculioninae
Agricultural pest insects
Strawberry pests
Beetles of North America